St. Matthew's Church in Winterhude, Hamburg, is a brick Lutheran church built from 1910 to 1912 in the baroque style.

The church is adorned with the colorful windows of Charles Crodel, who also made the stained-glass windows for the main church of St. James's and for St. Mary's Church in Fuhlsbüttel. St. Matthew's windows were created 1961 to 1971,

References
The information in this article is based on that in its German equivalent.
Matthäuskirche in Winterhude, Hamburg 2002.

External links
 Winterhude church communities

Hamburg Matthew Church
Matthew Church
Matthew Church